Robert Benjamin "Rob" Beckley (born August 20, 1975) is the lead singer and rhythm guitarist of the Christian rock band Pillar, which was voted Best Hard Rock Band in CCM Magazine's 2006 Reader's Choice Awards. Beckley started the band in 1998 in Kansas.

Beckley is married to Linda Beckley.  In addition to being the band's frontman, he is also a soldier in the United States Army Reserves.

Rob Beckley has contributed guest vocals to the songs such as, "Numb" by Tait, "Rock On" and "Help me Change" by KJ-52, "Silent Screams" by Éowyn, and "Indestructible" by Hardie Avenue. Rob is currently working on a solo album that will be exclusively sold on Idefimusic.

References

Further reading

External links
 Pillar's official website

1975 births
American heavy metal singers
American male singers
Living people
Nu metal singers
American performers of Christian music
United States Army reservists
Performers of Christian rock music
American heavy metal guitarists
Pillar (band) members
People from Hays, Kansas
American male guitarists
21st-century American singers